Heather Doram is an Antiguan artist, actor, activist  and educator, who is the designer of Antigua & Barbuda's national costume. In 2002 she was awarded the Grand Cross of the Most Illustrious Order of Merit (Antigua) in recognition of her lifetime achievements.

Biography 
Born in Antigua, to a seamstress mother and a father who worked in sugar industries, Doram's family lived on a number of sugar estates due to her father's work. She attended Antigua Girls’ High School in St John's and subsequently studied for an Associate Degree in Education from the University of the West Indies. She returned to teach at her former school and a few years later was awarded funding to study for a BFA in Textiles at the Edna Manley College of the Visual and Performing Arts in Kingston.

In 1994 she received a scholarship which enabled her to study for a MA degree at Savannah College of Art and Design (SCAD), where her work was chosen to represent the university at the Venice Biennale. After her graduation, SCAD also purchased the majority of her thesis portfolio for its permanent collection. On her return to Antigua she worked for the Ministry of Education, advising them on arts curricula, and in 2003 was appointed Director of Culture. Her works include a mural at V.C. Bird International Airport, as well as collages and woven wall-hangings. She designed award-winning carnival costumes designed with her husband Connie Doram. In 2020 she called for revisions to be made to the Antigua Carnival costume judging criteria, in order to include and acknowledge the significance of new styles of mas (masquerade costumes). She retired in 2006.

In addition to her work as an artist and educator, Doram also has a successful acting career, which began in the 1990s. She has appeared in film, television and stage roles that include: The Vagina Monologues, The Sweetest Mango, and a monologue by Zahra Airall.

National costume 
In 1992 a competition was held to design a national dress for Antigua & Barbuda, and it was won by Doram. The costume she designed is based on what women who worked as market vendors or bakers might have worn in 1834. The costume for women includes a dress made from a "madras plaid of red, gold and green" which is then covered with a white pinafore, and headscarf. The plaid was first designed in 1992 and formally adopted in 1994. Men's costume includes a waistcoat in the same plaid, as well as a white shirt, black trousers and a straw hat. A sample of the material is held at the Scottish Register of Tartans. Since its inception, the national dress has been reinterpreted by many designers, and in 2012 the first National Dress Day was held on 26 October.

Reception 
Due to her focus on the heritage of Antigua and Barbuda in her work, Paget Henry has described Doram as a "nationalist" artist.

Awards 

 Grand Cross of the Most Illustrious Order of Merit (2002)
 Woman of Wadadli Award for Culinary Arts (2020)

References

External links 

 Flickr: Mrs Heather Doram (photograph)
 YouTube: Untapped Potential: Mrs. Heather Doram: Antigua and Barbuda’s Cultural Icon (interview)
 YouTube: Step to the Throne - Conversation with Heather Doram (interview)

Living people
Year of birth missing (living people)
Antigua and Barbuda activists
Antigua and Barbuda artists
Women textile artists
Women educators
University of the West Indies alumni
Savannah College of Art and Design alumni
Recipients of orders, decorations, and medals of Antigua and Barbuda